Macrocranion is a genus of extinct mammal from the Eocene epoch of Europe and North America.  Exceptional fossils have has been found in the Messel Pit of Germany. Macrocranion species are often described as forest-floor predators, about the size of small squirrels but with longer limbs. 
The genus is represented at the Messel Pit site by two species, M. tupaidon and M. tenerum.
 
M. tupaiodon had woolly fur with no spikes. Although possibly an omnivore, fossil remains indicate the specimen had eaten fish near the time of its death. This small animal was approximately fifteen cm in length, with long back legs capable of considerable speed.

The fossil of M. tenerum is five cm long.  The species also had long legs for rapid movement, but its fur included a spiky protection. The long legs, however, indicate the animal couldn't have effectively rolled up for defense. Fossilized stomach remains show that M. tenerum'''s diet included ants, so it may have been an insectivore.

The oldest species are M. vandebroeki from the Paleocene-Eocene transition of Northern Europe and M. junnei'' from the Wasatchian (Early Eocene) of Wyoming.

References

Amphilemuridae
Prehistoric Eulipotyphla
Eocene mammals of Europe
Eocene mammals of North America
Prehistoric placental genera
Fossils of Germany
Fossil taxa described in 1949